Brown stingray may refer to:
 Red stingray (Dasyatis akajei)
 Estuary stingray (Dasyatis fluviorum)
 Broad stingray (Dasyatis lata)
 Jenkins' whipray (Himantura jenkinsii)
 Plain maskray (Neotrygon annotata)
See also: 
Brown whipray (Himantura toshi)
Brown stingaree (Urolophus westraliensis)